Sar Agha Seyed (also Romanized as Sar Āqā Seyyed) is a village in Miankuh-e Moguyi Rural District of the Central District of Kuhrang County, Chaharmahal and Bakhtiari province, Iran. At the 2006 census, its population was 1,360 in 208 households. The following census in 2011 counted 1,236 people in 275 households. The latest census in 2016 showed a population of 1,698 people in 380 households; it was the largest village in its rural district. The village is populated by Lurs.

The village is named after Aqa Seyyed shrine. It is known for its unusual architecture. Its interconnected buildings are built into the surrounding mountain. The roofs of the buildings serve as courtyards and streets of the buildings above. Most of the homes have no windows and only one door.

Because of the similarity of architecture, Sar Aqa Seyyed village is called The Masuleh of Zagros. Also, tourists explore this village for its nomads too.

External links

References 

Kuhrang County

Populated places in Chaharmahal and Bakhtiari Province

Populated places in Kuhrang County

Luri settlements in Chaharmahal and Bakhtiari Province